Encyclia cordigera is a species of orchid.

Synonyms
Cymbidium cordigerum Kunth (Basionym)
Epidendrum macrochilum Hook.
Epidendrum macrochilum var. roseum Bateman
Encyclia macrochila (Hook.) Neumann
Epidendrum macrochilum var. albopurpurea C.Morren
Epidendrum longipetalum God.-Leb.
Encyclia atropurpurea var. leucantha Schltr.
Encyclia atropurpurea var. rhodoglossa Schltr.
Encyclia doeringii Hoehne
Encyclia atropurpurea var. rosea (Bateman) Summerh.
Epidendrum doeringii (Hoehne) A.D.Hawkes
Encyclia cordigera var. rosea (Bateman) H.G.Jones
Epidendrum cordigerum (Kunth) Foldats
Encyclia cordigera f. leucantha (Schltr.) Withner

Gallery

External links 
 

cordigera
Orchids of Central America
Orchids of Belize